The 2017–18 Maryland Terrapins men's basketball team represented the University of Maryland, College Park in the 2017–18 NCAA Division I men's basketball season. They were led by seventh-year head coach Mark Turgeon and played their home games at Xfinity Center in College Park, Maryland, as members of the Big Ten Conference. They finished the season 19–13, 8–10 in Big Ten play to finish in eighth place. They lost in the second round of the Big Ten tournament to Wisconsin. They were invited to the College Basketball Invitational, but declined, marking their absence in a postseason tournament for the first time since 2014.

Maryland’s poor season was quite a surprise to many considering they had their three four-star recruits(Kevin Huerter, Anthony Cowan, Jr., and Justin Jackson) return from last year including getting two four-star recruits in Bruno Fernando and Darryl Morsell). They started off looking alright going 13-3(though not terribly challenging wins , but their three loses were for a combined 9 points against three later at large tournament teams in big ten rival Purdue, St. Bonaventure, and Syracuse) before losing ten of their next fifteen.

Previous season
The Terrapins finished the 2016–17 season 24–9, 12–6 in Big Ten play to finish in a tie for second place. As the No. 3 seed in the Big Ten tournament, they lost to Northwestern in the quarterfinals. They received an at-large bid to the NCAA tournament. As a No. 6 seed in the West region, they lost in the first round to Xavier.

Offseason

Departures
Melo Trimble declared for the NBA draft on March 29, 2017 and signed with an agent. He was not picked in the NBA draft.

Incoming transfers

2017 recruiting class

2018 Recruiting class

Roster

Schedule and results 
The 2018 Big Ten tournament will be held at Madison Square Garden in New York City. Due to the Big East's use of that venue for their conference tournament, the Big Ten tournament will take place one week earlier than usual, ending the week before Selection Sunday. This could result in teams having nearly two weeks off before the NCAA tournament. As a result, it is anticipated that the Big Ten regular season will begin in mid-December. Coaches have requested that no Big Ten game be scheduled between Christmas and New Year's Day, accordingly each team will play two conference games in early December before finishing non-conference play.

|-
!colspan=9 style=|Exhibition

|-
!colspan=9 style=|Regular season

|-
!colspan=9 style=|Big Ten tournament

Rankings

See also
2017–18 Maryland Terrapins women's basketball team

References

External links
 Official website
 Terps at ESPN

Maryland Terrapins men's basketball seasons
Maryland
Terra
Terra